Jeremiah Warren (born September 20, 1987) is an American football offensive lineman who is currently a free agent. He played in college for the University of South Florida Bulls. After going undrafted, he signed in May, 2012 with the New England Patriots The 31‑year‑old is listed as 6'4" and 329 pounds.

He has also been a member of the Arizona Cardinals, New Orleans Saints, Cleveland Browns, Tampa Bay Buccaneers and Tampa Bay Storm.

Warren has six brothers and sisters and his parents are Gloria and Jimmy Warren.

High school
Warren attended Bay High School in Panama City, Florida. He was a 3A honorable mention all-state and all-county as a junior and senior with 58 tackles and six sacks his senior year. He was 39-2 as a senior in wrestling, and was ranked sixth in the state as a junior in wrestling. He was district champion twice and also competed in the shot put and discus, winning district and regional titles in both events three times. He earned 10 varsity letters in football, wrestling and track and field.

College career
Warren at guard for the final 38 games of his career at South Florida and was named to the All-Big east second-team as a senior. He finished as a 5th Year Senior. He played in the 2012 East–West Shrine Game. He graduated from college with a degree in interdisciplinary social science.

References

External links
South Florida Bulls bio

1987 births
Living people
Bay High School (Panama City, Florida) alumni
University of South Florida alumni
People from Panama City, Florida
Players of American football from Florida
New England Patriots players
Arizona Cardinals players
New Orleans Saints players
Cleveland Browns players
Tampa Bay Buccaneers players
Tampa Bay Storm players
Baltimore Brigade players